The Frontier Organic Research Farm Botanical Garden 1 acre (4,000 m2) is a botanical garden operated by the Frontier Co-op corporation, and located with the research farm at company headquarters in Norway, Iowa, in the United States.

The garden contains 200 botanical species in 17 medicinal herb beds, with an elderberry grove as a windbreak. The cooperative also manages a 15-acre (61,000 m2) native prairie at the site, as well as 68 acres (275,000 m2) in Meigs County, Ohio operated as the National Center for the Preservation of Medicinal Herbs.

See also
 List of botanical gardens in the United States

Botanical gardens in Iowa
Botanical research institutes
Research institutes in Iowa
Protected areas of Benton County, Iowa